River Vashishti is one of the larger rivers in the Konkan coast of Maharashtra, India. The river begins in the Western Ghats and snakes its way westwards towards the Arabian Sea. Kolkewadi Dam near Alore has a vast reservoir, which feeds a tributary of the river.

History and settlements

The town of Chiplun lies on its banks. During the 2005 Maharashtra floods, the river swelled its banks, causing many of the city's residents to evacuate it.

Wildlife

The river has many riverine islands. Mugger crocodiles are known to inhabit the waters.

See also
 Jagbudi River
 Konkan Railway
 List of National Waterways in India
 List of rivers of India
 Western Ghats

References

Rivers of Maharashtra
Rivers of the Western Ghats